Belagavi City Corporation or Mahanagara Palike Belagavi is the municipal governing body of the city of Belagavi in the Indian state of Karnataka. The municipal corporation consists of democratically elected members, is headed by a mayor and administers the city's infrastructure and administration.  Municipal Corporation mechanism in India was introduced during British Rule with formation of municipal corporation in Madras (Chennai) in 1688, later followed by municipal corporations in Bombay (Mumbai) and Calcutta (Kolkata) by 1762. Belagavi Mahanagara Palike is headed by Mayor of city and governed by Commissioner.

History
It was established as Belgaum city Municipal Corporation Committee on 1 December 1851. It had a population of 23,115 and was having an income of 35,460 in 1851. It was the first Municipal Corporation that was established in Bombay Karnataka. Later, many other municipal corporations were established like Nipani in 1854 and subsequently, many other municipalities were established under Bombay District Municipalities Act of 1901. The Municipal Corporation Belgaum is dominated by Maharashtra ekikaran samithi since its establishment.

List of Corporators

Mayor
Mayor's post is reserved for General category and Deputy Mayor's Post was limited to General Woman.

Functions 
Belagavi Mahanagara Palike is created for the following functions:

 Planning for the town including its surroundings which are covered under its Department's Urban Planning Authority .
 Approving construction of new buildings and authorising use of land for various purposes.
 Improvement of the town's economic and Social status.
 Arrangements of water supply towards commercial, residential and industrial purposes.
 Planning for fire contingencies through Fire Service Departments.
 Creation of solid waste management, public health system and sanitary services.
 Working for the development of ecological aspect like development of Urban Forestry and making guidelines for environmental protection.
 Working for the development of weaker sections of the society like mentally and physically handicapped, old age and gender biased people.
 Making efforts for improvement of slums and poverty removal in the town.

Revenue sources 

The following are the Income sources for the Corporation from the Central and State Government.

Revenue from taxes 
Following is the Tax related revenue for the corporation.

 Property tax.
 Profession tax.
 Entertainment tax.
 Grants from Central and State Government like Goods and Services Tax.
 Advertisement tax.

Revenue from non-tax sources 

Following is the Non Tax related revenue for the corporation.

 Water usage charges.
 Fees from Documentation services.
 Rent received from municipal property.
 Funds from municipal bonds.

Revenue from taxes 
Following is the Tax related revenue for the corporation.

 Property tax.
 Profession tax.
 Entertainment tax.
 Grants from Central and State Government like Goods and Services Tax.
 Advertisement tax.

Revenue from non-tax sources 

Following is the Non Tax related revenue for the corporation.

 Water usage charges.
 Fees from Documentation services.
 Rent received from municipal property.
 Funds from municipal bonds.

References

External links 
 Official website

Municipal corporations in Karnataka
Belgaum
1851 establishments in India